Richard Hamilton Hill (28 November 1900 – 5 October 1959) was an English first-class cricketer active 1921–31 who played for Middlesex and Marylebone Cricket Club (MCC). He was born in Kensington; died in Westerham.

References

1900 births
1959 deaths
English cricketers
Middlesex cricketers
Marylebone Cricket Club cricketers
Free Foresters cricketers
H. D. G. Leveson Gower's XI cricketers